The 1989 Presto Tivolis season was the 15th season of the franchise in the Philippine Basketball Association (PBA). Previously known as Presto Ice Cream Flavor Specialist in the Open Conference.

Transactions

Trades

Occurrences
Assistant Coach Adriano "Bong" Go was named the new head coach of Presto at the start of the season.

Former Presto coach Baby Dalupan, who was given a new task as team manager, accepted the offer to coach the Purefoods Hotdogs during the second week of April, the "Maestro" left the Gokongwei ballclub he led to five championships from 1984-1987.

Coach Bong Go was replaced by the comebacking Jimmy Mariano, the team's mentor from 1981-1983, at the start of the Third Conference.

Notable dates
March 5: Presto Ice Cream clobbered Alaska Milk, 118-108, at the start of the PBA Open Conference. The Flavor Specialists got off to a rousing start with import Walker Russell, a six-year NBA veteran providing the spark and rookies Zaldy Realubit and Hernani Demigillo adding muscle underneath and trade recruits Manny Victorino and Marte Saldaña scoring the much needed points. 

March 12: Rookie Zaldy Realubit leaped from behind Rey Cuenco and Bobby Parks to pluck the big offensive rebound, then scored the marginal gun-beating basket for a 134-132 win by Presto over Formula Shell and gave the Flavor Specialists its second win in three starts. 

March 28: Allan Caidic equalled the most points in one quarter (first set by Atoy Co in 1982) by scoring 26 points in the first quarter alone and finish with 42 points to lead Presto Ice Cream to a 123-112 win over Añejo Rum. Import Walker Russell registered his second triple-double of 30 points, 12 rebounds and 12 assists. 

April 16: Presto Ice Cream started their semifinal assignment on a high note as they defeated San Miguel Beermen, 109-100, handed the defending Open Conference champions their first taste of defeat after a 10-game sweep in the eliminations.  
   
April 18: The Flavor Specialist scored their second victory in the semifinals with a 131-124 win over Purefoods Hotdogs, spoiling the debut of their former coach Baby Dalupan, who now calls the shots for the Hotdogs. 

April 25: Allan Caidic erupted for a conference-high 45 points while Walker Russell dished out his seventh triple-double performance of 41 points, 10 rebounds and 12 assists to bolster Presto's finals chances in a 143-135 win over Formula Shell. 

June 29: The Tivolis eked out a 113-108 victory over San Miguel as they snapped the Beermen's three-game winning skein in the All-Filipino Conference. The win was Presto's second in three games. 

October 1: In the first game at the start of the third conference, Presto import Terrance Bailey debut with 61 points as the Tivolis defeated Añejo Rum, 153-142, the Rum Masters got an impressive 68 points from Carlos Briggs, their debuting import who is the shortest among the six reinforcements. 

November 2: Allan Caidic shattered the all-time high scoring mark for locals by erupting with 68 points in Presto's 175-159 victory over Alaska Milk at the start of the Reinforced Conference semifinal round. Caidic reset Atoy Co's record in individual scoring in one quarter by one point as he finished with 27 and became the league's undoubted top three-point gunner with a record 15 triples, breaking Hills Bros' import Jose Slaughter's 14 hits that was registered two years ago, Caidic also tied Ricardo Brown's output of 41 points in a half in an amazing display of markmanship that had the capacity crowd roaring in approval and with Caidic's 15 triples, Presto set an all-time high of 18 three-pointers with Bailey converting two and Bernardo Carpio had one, Terrance Bailey also set an all-time high of 20 assists in that game. 

November 12: Terrance Bailey riddled the hotdogs' defenses with smashing drives and stunning dunks and Allan Caidic came alive with 11 points in the fourth quarter as Presto's 1-2 punch led the Tivolis to a come-from-behind 161-153 victory over Purefoods. Bailey topscored with 63 points as he joined forces with Caidic in towing Presto back from a 115-128 deficit in the fourth quarter. The Tivolis stopped the three-game winning run by Purefoods and gained their seventh win in 14 games.

Roster

Additions

Subtraction
{| cellspacing="0"
| valign="top" |

Imports

References

Great Taste Coffee Makers seasons
Presto